The Custard Cup is a 1923 American drama film directed by Herbert Brenon and written by G. Marion Burton and Ralph Spence. It is based on the 1921 novel The Custard Cup by Florence Bingham Livingston. The film stars Mary Carr, Myrta Bonillas, Miriam Battista, Jerry Devine, Ernest McKay, and Peggy Shaw. The film was released on January 1, 1923, by Fox Film Corporation.

Plot
As described in a film magazine, Mrs. Penfield (Carr), or Penzie, known for her goodness, lives in a little group settlement with her two adopted children. Crink (Devine), the eldest boy, finds little waif Lettie (Battista), who joins the family. Through Penzie's care the girl improves. Also in the neighborhood are the mysterious couple Frank (Sedley) and Gussie Bosley (Bonillas) who are counterfeiters. During a boat excursion sponsored by Alderman Curry (Hendricks), Frank is discovered passing off his false notes and Gussie gives Penzie a large bill to buy refreshments for the children but to return the change to her. Frank tries to destroy the evidence and burns the remaining bills in his pockets. Through his carelessness, the boat catches fire, forcing all on board to flee. Later, as the law enforcement net begins to close on them, the Bosleys prepare to leave but are apprehended by Secret Service men. Penzie, who has been falsely accused of passing false money, is exonerated.

Cast
Mary Carr as Mrs. Penfield
Myrta Bonillas as Gussie Bosley
Miriam Battista as Lettie
Jerry Devine as Crink
Ernest McKay as Thad
Peggy Shaw as Lorene Percy
Lisle Leigh as Mrs. Percy
Fred Esmelton as Jeremiah Winston
Henry Sedley as Frank Bosley
Louis Hendricks as Alderman Curry
Edward Boring as Mr. Wopple
Emily Lorraine as Perennial Prue
Ben Lyon as Dick Chase
Richard Collins as Counterfeiter
Nick Hollen as Detective

Preservation
With no copies located in film archives, The Custard Cup is a lost film.

References

External links

1923 films
1920s English-language films
Silent American drama films
1923 drama films
Fox Film films
Films directed by Herbert Brenon
American silent feature films
American black-and-white films
1920s American films